Olivenite is a copper arsenate mineral, formula Cu2AsO4OH. It crystallizes in the monoclinic system (pseudo-orthorhombic), and is sometimes found in small brilliant crystals of simple prismatic habit terminated by domal faces. More commonly, it occurs as globular aggregates of acicular crystals, these fibrous forms often having a velvety luster; sometimes it is lamellar in structure, or soft and earthy.

A characteristic feature, and one to which the name alludes (German, Olivenerz, of A. G. Werner, 1789), is the olive-green color, which varies in shade from blackish-green in the crystals to almost white in the finely fibrous variety known as woodcopper. The hardness is 3, and the specific gravity is 4.3. The mineral was formerly found in some abundance, associated with limonite and quartz, in the upper workings in the copper mines of the St Day district in Cornwall; also near Redruth, and in the Tintic Mining District in Utah. It is a mineral of secondary origin, a result of the oxidation of copper ores and arsenopyrite.

The arsenic of olivenite is sometimes partly replaced by a small amount of phosphorus, and in the species libethenite we have the corresponding copper phosphate Cu2PO4OH. This is found as small dark green crystals resembling olivenite at Ľubietová in the Slovak Republic, and in small amount also in Cornwall. Other members of this isomorphous group of minerals are adamite, Zn2AsO4OH, and eveite, Mn2AsO4OH.

References

Copper(II) minerals
Arsenate minerals
Monoclinic minerals
Minerals in space group 14